Petri Juha Sarvamaa (born 15 September 1960) is a Finnish politician who has been serving as Member of the European Parliament (MEP) since 2014. He is a member of the National Coalition Party, part of the European People's Party. Before becoming an MEP, he had a long career as a journalist at Finland's national broadcasting company Yle.

Political career
Since becoming a Member of the European Parliament in 2012, Sarvamaa has been serving on the Committee on Budgetary Control. In this capacity, he was the rapporteur in charge of several reports on the budgets of agencies of the European Union. In 2019, he drafted (together with Eider Gardiazabal) legislation on cutting EU funds to member states that undermine the rule of law.

Sarvamaa has also served on the Committee on Transport and Tourism (2012-2014), the Committee on Budgets (2014-2019), and the Committee on Agriculture and Rural Development (since 2019).

In addition to his committee assignments, Sarvamaa is a supporter of the MEP Alliance for Mental Health; the European Parliament Intergroup on Climate Change, Biodiversity and Sustainable Development; the European Parliament Intergroup on LGBT Rights; the European Parliament Intergroup on Disability; and of the European Parliament Intergroup on Anti-Corruption.

Recognition 
Sarvamaa was ranked as one of the 15 most influential MEPs in the 2014-19 legislature by VoteWatch, as measured by the positions held, the number of reports and opinions and the votes won, weighed by perceived importance and normalized by average influence of their country.

Personal life 
Sarvamaa's father's, Boris Sarvamaa's (né Saharov), family emigrated to Finland from St. Petersburg during the Russian Revolution. Sarvamaa is an Orthodox Christian.

References

External links

1960 births
Living people
People from Joensuu
Finnish journalists
National Coalition Party MEPs
MEPs for Finland 2014–2019
MEPs for Finland 2019–2024
Eastern Orthodox Christians from Finland
Finnish people of Russian descent